Charles Hallock  (March 13, 1834 – December 2, 1917) was an American author and publisher born in New York City to Gerard Hallock and Elizabeth Allen. On September 10, 1855 he married Amelia J. Wardell.

He studied at Yale, 1850–51, and Amherst College.  He was assistant editor of the New Haven Register, 1854–56; proprietor and associate editor of the New York Journal of Commerce, of which his father was editor, 1856-62. He was founder and publisher, from 1873–80, of Forest and Stream, which was later incorporated into its main competitor Field and Stream.

He experimented in Sunflower cultivation, using the seed for oil; in sheep raising on Indian reservations; in establishing a reservation for sportsmen in Minnesota; in the development of Alaska and Florida, and of special industries in North Carolina; and in various other sanitary and economic schemes.

He originated the code of uniform game laws and incorporated with Fayette S. Giles and others the first great American game preserve at Blooming Grove, Pike County, Pennsylvania

Hallock, Minnesota was named after him.

Works 
Recluse of the Oconee 1854 
Life of Stonewall Jackson 1863 
The Fishing Tourist 1873 Online Version
Camp Life in Florida 1875 Online Version
The Sportsman's Gazetteer 1877  Online Version
Vacation Rambles in Michigan 1877 
American Club List and Glossary 1878 
Our New Alaska 1886 
The Salmon Fisher 1890 Online Version
Origin of the American indigenes 1902 
Luminous Bodies Here and Hereafter 1906 Online Version
An Angler's Reminiscences. A Record of  Sport, Travel and Adventure. With Autobiography of the Author 1913 Online Version

References 

“Hallock, Charles” American Authors 1600-1900, The H. W. Wilson Company, 1938
Swanson, Gloria. (April 1979)  A Man Named Hallock City of Hallock Retrieved March 21, 2008
Dyer, Charles N. History of the Town of Plainfield, Hampshire County, Mass., From Its Settlement to 1891, Including a Genealogical History of Twenty Three of the Original Settlers and Their Descendants, with Anecdotes and Sketches. (p. 154)  Northampton, Mass: Press of Gazette Print. Co, 1891.  googlebooks Accessed March 21, 2008
Hallock, Charles. An Angler's Reminiscences; A Record of Sport, Travel and Adventure, with Autobiography of the Author.'' Cincinnati: Sportsmen's Review Pub. Co, 1913. googlebooks Retrieved March 21, 2008

External links
Forest & Streams website

1834 births
1917 deaths
Amherst College alumni
19th-century American writers
Angling writers
Kittson County, Minnesota
American magazine publishers (people)
American editors
Yale University alumni
19th-century American businesspeople